The Mighty Hunter is a 1943 picture book by Berta and Elmer Hader. The story is about a Native American boy who wants to go hunting. The book was a recipient of a 1944 Caldecott Honor for its illustrations.

References

1943 children's books
American picture books
Caldecott Honor-winning works
Macmillan Publishers books